Mr. & Mrs. Adelman is a 2017 Romantic comedy film, directed by Nicolas Bedos. The film is written by Nicolas Bedos, and Doria Tillier, and produced by François Kraus, and Denis Pineau-Valencienne under the banner of Les Films du Kiosque. The film stars Doria Tillier, and Nicolas Bedos in the lead roles alongside Denis Podalydès, Antoine Gouy, Christiane Millet, and Pierre Arditi.

Plot

Cast 
 Doria Tillier as Sarah Adelman
 Nicolas Bedos as Victor de Richemont dit Adelman
 Denis Podalydès as The psy
 Antoine Gouy as Antoine Grillot
 Christiane Millet as Sylvie de Richemont
 Pierre Arditi as Claude de Richemont
 Zabou Breitman as The school director
 Julien Boisselier as Antoine de Richemont
 Jean-Pierre Lorit as Marc Danchelier
 Lola Bessis as Mélanie
 Jack Lang as himself

Reception

Critical response 
Jordan Mintzer of The Hollywood Reporter wrote, "Nicolas Bedos and Doria Tillier co-wrote and star in this sprawling dramedy about two Frenchies who spend more than 40 years in a love-hate relationship." Terry Segal of The Atlanta Jewish Times wrote, "The startling ending is gripping, and secrets are revealed. The fast-paced “Mr. & Mrs. Adelman” is interesting and holds the viewer’s attention throughout the film."France Today wrote, "Panned by critics as self-indulgent, Nicolas Bedos’s directorial debut certainly revels in wrong-footing gullible viewers."

Accolades

References

External links 

 
 
 

2017 films
2017 romantic comedy films
Films directed by Nicolas Bedos
French romantic comedy films
2010s French films